Silicon Valley International School, colloquially INTL, (pronounced "international"), is a private grade day school located in Silicon Valley, with two campuses in Palo Alto (formerly International School of the Peninsula, ISTP) and Menlo Park (formerly Alto International School).

Silicon Valley International School teaches in English language, Mandarin Chinese, French language and German language. INTL is an International Baccalaureate World School, and teaches the Primary Years Programme (PYP), the Middle Years Programme (MYP) and the Diploma Programme (DP).

The French AEFE designates this school as a French international school, as the École internationale de la Péninsule.

History 

On January 1, 2021, Silicon Valley International School (INTL) and Alto International School legally merged, united under the same name - Silicon Valley International School (INTL).  

ISTP was established in 1978, as the Peninsula French-American School (PFAS), and Alto was established ten years later in 1988 as the German-speaking Alto International School. In 1996, ISTP began teaching in Mandarin Chinese program and middle school program and changed its name to International School of The Peninsula. In 2019, ISTP gained authorization to offer the International Baccalaureate (IB) Primary Years Programme (PYP) and later was authorized to provide the Middle Years Programme (MYP). In September 2000, ISTP moved their elementary and middle school program into the Cohn Campus. As the culmination of a multi-year research and rebranding project, in 2020, ISTP's name was officially changed to Silicon Valley International School (INTL), to better reflect its location and growth into an international school with a global reputation and reach. When INTL and Alto finalized their merger at the end of 2020 and start of 2021, the two campuses became one school under the banner of INTL with Alto's campus becoming INTL's Willows Campus alongside of the INTL Cohn Campus.

Accomplishments 

ISTP has been in the annual San Francisco Chinese New Year Festival and Parade. The school has received awards in the Amateur Self-Built Float Category in previous years, winning either 1st or 2nd place.

Based on the International Schools' Assessment (ISA) and the PISA test of the Organization for Economic Cooperation and Development (OECD), Alto students used to consistently outperform comparable schools worldwide and in 2017 Alto's 9th Grade students had tested above the highest ranking schools systems in the world and scored in the top 10% worldwide. In addition, according to the Presidential Honor Roll of the American Association of Teachers of German, students of Alto International School ranked in 2017 and 2018 within the top 3 schools in California and within the top 10 schools nationwide.

In 2016, ISTP won Palo Alto's 4th annual Mayor's Green Business Leader Award.

In 2017, 2018, and 2019, the "Best of the Best" edition of the Bay Area Magazine, Alto International School was awarded Gold and Silver medals for the best school in the following 6 categories: Preschool, Elementary School, Middle School, High School, International School and Language Immersion Program.

In 2021, Alto and ISTP merged to become Silicon Valley International School and the Menlo Park Alto campus was renamed to the INTL Willows Campus, which now houses their preschool/pre-kindergarten and upper school (6th-12th). 

In 2022, "Best of the Best" by Bay Area Parent, INTL was awarded Gold medals for the Best International School, Best Preschool or Childcare Center, and Best Private High School. In addition, INTL was awarded Silver medals for Language Immersion, Best Private Middle School, and Best Technology School or Program.

Accreditations 
 California Association of Independent Schools (CAIS)
 Western Association of Schools and Colleges (WASC)
 French Ministry of Education
 Agency for French Teaching Abroad (AEFE)
 National Association of Independent School (NAIS)
 Independent Schools of the San Francisco Bay Area (ISSFBA)
 International Baccalaureate Organization (IBO)

See also 

 Agency for French Teaching Abroad (Agence pour l'enseignement français à l'étranger)
 Education in France
 American School of Paris - An American international school in France

External links
 Silicon Valley International School

References

Chinese-American culture in California
French-American culture in California
Private elementary schools in California
Private middle schools in California
Buildings and structures in Palo Alto, California
Educational institutions established in 1979
Schools in Santa Clara County, California
AEFE accredited schools
Bilingual schools
1979 establishments in California
French international schools in the United States
International schools in California